The Asociación Nacional de Guías Scouts del Ecuador (ANGSE; National Girl Guide Association of Ecuador) is the national Guiding organization of Ecuador. It serves 225 members (as of 2003). Founded in 1919, the girls-only organization became a full member of the World Association of Girl Guides and Girl Scouts in 1966.

Program
The association is divided in four branches according to age:
 Alitas - ages 7 to 10
 Juniors - ages 11 to 13
 Cadetes - ages 14 to 16
 Guías Mayores - ages 16 to 18

Emblem
The membership badge of the Asociación Nacional de Guías Scouts del Ecuador incorporates the Ciudad Mitad del Mundo monument delineating the equator.

References

External links

See also
 Asociación de Scouts del Ecuador

World Association of Girl Guides and Girl Scouts member organizations
Scouting and Guiding in Ecuador
Youth organizations established in 1919